The Divisiones Regionales de Fútbol are the Spanish football regional divisions. They are administered by the Autonomous football federations. The level immediately above (in the fifth tier) is the Tercera División RFEF. The autonomous regional divisions include:

External links
All regional leagues on Futbolme.com

 
Football leagues in Spain
Spain